An Overdose of Death... is the third full-length album released by American thrash metal band Toxic Holocaust on September 2, 2008. Music videos have been made for "Wild Dogs", "Nuke the Cross", and "The Lord of the Wasteland". Critical reviews also mark these as the best songs of a good but mixed album.

Track listing

All songs written by Joel Grind. 

The Japanese edition includes the bonus track "666".

Personnel
Toxic Holocaust
 Joel Grind - vocals, rhythm guitar, bass
 'Personality' Paul Barke - lead guitar, production
 Donny Paycheck - drums

Production
 Jack Endino - producer
 Halseycaust - artwork

References

2008 albums
Toxic Holocaust albums
Relapse Records albums
Albums produced by Jack Endino